Callie Virginia Granade (née Smith; born March 7, 1950) is a senior United States district judge of the United States District Court for the Southern District of Alabama. The first female federal prosecutor in Mobile, Granade became the first woman in Alabama to be named a fellow of the American College of Trial Lawyers, and the first female federal district judge in her district.

Early life and education
Born in Lexington, Virginia, Granade is the granddaughter of former Judge Richard Rives of the United States Court of Appeal for the Fifth Circuit, the federal judge who wrote the majority opinion in Browder v. Gayle (1956) finding Montgomery, Alabama's bus segregation unconstitutional. She graduated from Hollins College with her Bachelor of Arts degree in 1972 and later from University of Texas School of Law with a Juris Doctor in 1975.

Legal career
Following law school graduation, Granade became a law clerk for John Godbold of the United States Court of Appeals for the Fifth Circuit (1975 to 1976). She was an Assistant United States Attorney in the Southern District of Alabama from 1977 to 2001, and the district's interim United States Attorney from 2001 to 2002. Among her high-profile cases in her 25 years as a federal prosecutor, Granade led the successful prosecution of Mobile City Commissioner Lambert C. Mims for extortion.

Federal judicial career
On the recommendation of Senators Jeff Sessions and Richard Shelby, President George W. Bush nominated Granade to the United States District Court for the Southern District of Alabama on September 4, 2001, after Judge Alex T. Howard Jr. assumed senior status. Granade was confirmed by the Senate on February 4 and received her commission on February 12, 2002. She served as Chief Judge from 2003 to 2010. She assumed senior status on March 7, 2016.

Perhaps her highest profile ruling was issued on January 23, 2015, when Judge Granade struck down Alabama's ban on same-sex marriage as violating the Fourteenth Amendment's guarantees of equal protection and due process.

References

Sources

Cook v. Atwood Oceanics
Activist judge? Careful jurist? Meet the woman who made gay marriage legal in Alabama, AL.com, February 7, 2015

1950 births
Living people
Assistant United States Attorneys
Hollins University alumni
Judges of the United States District Court for the Southern District of Alabama
People from Lexington, Virginia
United States district court judges appointed by George W. Bush
21st-century American judges
University of Texas School of Law alumni
21st-century American women judges